George Georges (born George Georgouras; 15 April 1920  –  23 September 2002) was a Labor senator for Queensland from 1968 to 1986, and independent senator from 1986 to 1987.

Early life 
George Georges (born George Georgouras) was born in Darwin, Northern Territory on April 15, 1920, the son of Athanasios Georgouras and his wife Panayiota Stergoulis. His father emigrated to Australia in 1912. He was educated in Ingham and at the South Brisbane Intermediate School before enrolling at Brisbane State High School where he was the captain of the rugby union team. Georges enrolled at the University of Queensland but did not complete his studies there. He later received further education at Brisbane North TAFE in business management.

Career 
Georges was a humanist and left-wing socialist jailed several times by the Queensland state government of Joh Bjelke-Petersen in the 1970s and 1980s, including the SEQEB strike dispute, as a consequence of his activities in promoting what he saw as civil liberties and workers' rights.

In 1986 he resigned from the Labor Party to vote against the Australia Card legislation. From 15 December 1986 he served as a senate independent after quitting the ALP. He stood as an independent candidate for the Senate at the 1987 election, but failed to get re-elected, receiving 1.8% of the Queensland vote.

Legacy 
Georges married Gloria Wishart in 1952 and they had two children. He died in Canberra on 23 September 2002 after a long illness.

References

1920 births
2002 deaths
Members of the Australian Senate for Queensland
People educated at Brisbane State High School
Australian Labor Party members of the Parliament of Australia
Independent members of the Parliament of Australia
20th-century Australian politicians
Australian people of Greek descent